Together Forever is the debut album by Puerto Rican-American singer Lisette Melendez, released in 1991 by Columbia Records. The album reached the top ten of the Billboard Heatseekers chart.

Three singles were released. "Together Forever" reached number 35 on the Billboard Hot 100 in April 1991. The second single, "A Day in My Life (Without You)", rose to number 49 on the Hot 100. "Never Say Never" appeared on the dance charts at number 45 in March 1992.

The album was released in Japan on July 1, 1994, after the success of the song "Goody Goody" and the album True to Life. Together Forever stayed for one week on the Oricon chart, peaking at number 100.

Track listing

Charts

Singles - Billboard (United States)

References

1991 debut albums
Lisette Melendez albums